Moore, Indiana is an unincorporated community in Wilmington Township, DeKalb County, Indiana in the northeastern corner of the state.

An early variant name was Moore's Station. Moore contained a post office from 1875 until 1909, and the post office was called Moore's Station in its early years.

Geography

The community is northeast of Auburn and south of U.S. Route 6 (Grand Army of the Republic Highway).

References

Unincorporated communities in DeKalb County, Indiana
Unincorporated communities in Indiana